Hatton is a small village and civil parish in the East Lindsey district of Lincolnshire, England.

Neighbouring villages are Sotby, Panton, and Great Sturton.

It forms part of the Bardney Limewoods National Nature Reserve. Hatton Meadows, a nature reserve belonging to the Lincolnshire Wildlife Trust, lies to the north of Hatton Wood.

The National Transmission System has one of its twenty six compressor stations, driven by three gas turbines, just off the A158 west of the village at Hatton Bridge.

Hatton church is dedicated to Saint Stephen, and is a Grade II listed building dating from the 13th century, rebuilt in 1870 by James Fowler.

The deserted medieval village (DMV) of Schankeston was in or near the village.

A public house on the A158, The New Midge, is currently closed.

References

External links

Villages in Lincolnshire
Sites of Special Scientific Interest in Lincolnshire
Civil parishes in Lincolnshire
East Lindsey District